Charles Michael Thacker (born 10 August 1996) is an English rugby union centre who plays for Nottingham in the RFU Championship. He previously played for Leicester Tigers in Premiership Rugby.

Early life
Thacker was born in Leicester. His elder brother is Bristol Bears hooker Harry Thacker, and his father Troy Thacker also played hooker for Leicester.

Career
Thacker made his Leicester Tigers debut on 1 November 2014  in a 17-16 win against London Irish in the Anglo-Welsh Cup.  He scored his first try for the club on 4 November 2017 against Gloucester again in the Anglo-Welsh Cup and was named as the fans' man of the match for his performance.

On 15 May 2019 he was announced as one of the players to leave Leicester following the end of the 2018-19 Premiership Rugby season.

References

1996 births
Living people
English rugby union players
Leicester Tigers players
Rugby union centres
Rugby union players from Leicester